The Repatriation of Cossacks or "Betrayal of the Cossacks" occurred when Cossacks, ethnic Russians and Ukrainians who were opposed to the Soviet Union (such as by fighting for Germany) were handed over by British and US forces to the Soviet Union after World War II. Near the end of the war, many Cossacks fled to western Europe, fearing the Red Army, in hopes of surrendering instead to the military forces of the United States or the UK. Once they were arrested by the Allies, they were packed into small trains and were promised to be sent to the West. Unbeknownst to them, they were instead being sent to the Soviet Union. Many men, women, and children were sent to the Gulag camps, and many were worked to death. The repatriations were agreed to in the Yalta Conference; Joseph Stalin claimed the prisoners were Soviet citizens as of 1939, although many of them had left Russia before or soon after the end of the Russian Civil War or had been born abroad, hence never holding Soviet citizenship.

Most of those Cossacks and Russians fought the Allies, specifically the Soviets, in service to the Axis powers, yet the repatriations included non-combatant civilians as well. Motivations varied, but the primary reasons were the brutal repression of Cossacks by the Soviet government, e.g., the portioning of the lands of the Terek, Ural and Semirechye hosts, forced cultural assimilation and repression of the Russian Orthodox Church, deportation and, ultimately, the Soviet famine of 1932–33. General Poliakov and Colonel Chereshneff referred to it as the "massacre of Cossacks at Lienz".

Background
During the Russian Civil War (1917–1923), Cossack leaders and their governments generally sided with the White movement. As a result, the majority of Cossack soldiers were mobilized against the Red Army. As the Soviets emerged victorious in the civil war, many Cossack veterans, fearing reprisals and the Bolsheviks’ de-Cossackization policies, fled abroad to countries in Central and Western Europe. In exile, they formed their own anti-communist organisations or joined other Russian émigré groups such as the Russian All-Military Union (ROVS).

The Cossacks who remained in Russia endured more than a decade of continual repression, e.g., the portioning of the lands of the Terek, Ural and Semirechye hosts, forced cultural assimilation and repression of the Russian Orthodox Church, deportation and, ultimately, the Soviet famine of 1932–33. The repressions ceased and some privileges were restored after publication of And Quiet Flows the Don (1934) by Mikhail Sholokhov.

Second World War
After Adolf Hitler launched the invasion of the Soviet Union on 22 June 1941, several anticommunist Cossack leaders, including Kuban ataman Naumenko, Terek ataman Vdovenko, former Don ataman Pyotr Krasnov and the Cossack National Center chairman Vasily Glazkov, all publicly praised the German campaign.  Despite this outpouring of support, Hitler and other top officials initially denied Cossack émigrés from having any military or political role in the war against the Soviets. It was not until 1942 when Ostministerium openly began employing Cossack émigrés for propaganda and administrative purposes.

While top Nazi officials were slow to embrace anticommunist Cossacks, some Wehrmacht field commanders had utilized Cossack defectors from the Red Army since the summer of 1941. In early 1943, most of the Cossack units fighting with the German Army were consolidated into the First Cossack Cavalry Division under the command of General Helmuth von Pannwitz. Later that year, the Cossack cavalry division was deployed to Axis-occupied Yugoslavia to fight Tito's Partisans. In late 1944, the division was incorporated into the Waffen-SS and expanded into the XV SS Cossack Cavalry Corps.

Another Cossack group whose fate became tied with the Germans consisted of approximately 25,000 Cossack refugees and irregulars who evacuated the North Caucasus alongside the Wehrmacht in 1943. This group, known as “Cossachi Stan” migrated between southern Ukraine, Novogrudek (Byelorussia), Tolmezzo (Italy) and was forced to withdraw to Lienz in Allied-occupied Austria, at the close of the war.

Yalta and Tehran Conferences

The agreements of the Yalta and Tehran Conferences, signed by US President Franklin D. Roosevelt, Soviet Premier Joseph Stalin and British Prime Minister Winston Churchill, determined the fates of the Cossacks who did not fight for the Soviets, because many were POWs of the Nazis. Stalin obtained Allied agreement to the repatriation of every so-called "Soviet" citizen held prisoner because the Allied leaders feared that the Soviets either might delay or refuse repatriation of the Allied POWs whom the Red Army had liberated from Nazi POW camps.

It was in the context of the wish to remain on good terms with Stalin that, according to Edward Peterson, the US chose to hand over several hundred thousand German prisoners to the Soviet Union in May 1945 as a "gesture of friendship".

Although the agreement for the deportation of all "Soviet" citizens did not include White Russian emigres who had fled during the Bolshevik Revolution before the establishment of the USSR, all Cossack prisoners of war were later demanded. After Yalta, Churchill questioned Stalin, asking, "Did the Cossacks and other minorities fight against us?" Stalin replied, "They fought with ferocity, not to say savagery, for the Germans".

In 1944 Gen. Krasnov and other Cossack leaders had persuaded Hitler to allow Cossack troops, as well as civilians and non-combatant Cossacks, to permanently settle in the sparsely settled Carnia, in the Alps. The Cossacks moved there and established garrisons and settlements, requisitioning houses by evicting the inhabitants, with several stanitsas and posts, their administration, churches, schools and military units. There, they fought the partisans and persecuted the local population, committing numerous atrocities. The measures consisting of clearing the Italian inhabitants of the area from their homes and taking stern measures to not allow partisans from the hills to “pass through alive” in the area led the Italians to use the epithet “Barbarian Cossacks.” 

When the Allies progressed from central Italy to the Italian Alps, Italian partisans under Gen. Contini ordered the Cossacks to leave Carnia and go north to Austria. There, near Lienz, the British Army kept the Cossacks in a hastily established camp. For a few days the British supplied them with food; meanwhile, the Red Army's advance units approached to within a few miles east, rapidly advancing to meet the Allies. On 28 May 1945 the British transported 2,046 disarmed Cossack officers and generals—including the cavalry Generals Pyotr Krasnov and Andrei Shkuro—to a nearby Red Army-held town and handed them over to the Red Army commanding general, who ordered them tried for treason. Many Cossack leaders had never been citizens of the Soviet Union, having fled revolutionary Russia in 1920; hence they believed they could not be guilty of treason. Some were executed immediately. High-ranking officers were tried in Moscow, and then executed. On 17 January 1947 Krasnov and Shkuro were hanged in a public square. Gen. Helmuth von Pannwitz of the Wehrmacht, who was instrumental in the formation and leadership of the Cossacks taken from German POW camps to fight the Soviets, decided to share the Cossacks' Soviet repatriation and was executed for war crimes, along with five Cossack generals and atamans in Moscow in 1947.

On 1 June 1945 the UK placed 32,000 Cossacks (with their women and children) into trains and trucks and delivered them to the Red Army for repatriation to the Soviets; similar repatriations occurred that year in the US occupation zones in Austria and Germany. Most Cossacks were sent to the gulags in far northern Russia and Siberia, and many died; some, however, escaped, and others lived until the amnesty of 1953  (see below). In total, some two million people were repatriated to the Soviets at the end of the Second World War.

Lienz
On 28 May 1945 the British Army arrived at Camp Peggetz, in Lienz, where there were 2,479 Cossacks, including 2,201 officers and soldiers.   They went to invite the Cossacks to an important conference with British officials, informing them that they would return to Lienz by 18:00 that evening; some Cossacks were worried, but the British reassured them that everything was in order. One British officer told the Cossacks, "I assure you, on my word of honour as a British officer, that you are just going to a conference".  By then British–Cossack relationships were friendly to the extent that many on both sides had developed feelings for one another. The Lienz Cossack repatriation was exceptional, because the Cossacks forcefully resisted their repatriation to the USSR; one Cossack noted, "The NKVD or the Gestapo would have slain us with truncheons, the British did it with their word of honour."  Julius Epstein described the scene that occurred:

The British transported the Cossacks to a prison where they were handed over to the waiting Soviets. In the town of Tristach, Austria, there was a memorial commemorating General von Pannwitz and the soldiers of the XV SS Cossack Cavalry Corps who were killed in action or died as POWs. This memorial was removed in September 2021 because of the connection between General von Pannwitz and both the SA and the SS, as well as his loyalty to the Nazi regime.

Other repatriations

Judenburg, Austria
On 1–2 June 18,000 Cossacks were handed over to the Soviets near the town of Judenburg, Austria; of those in custody, some ten officers and 50–60 Cossacks escaped the guards' cordon with hand grenades, and hid in the nearby woods.

Near Graz, Austria
The Russian Cossacks of XV Cossack Cavalry Corps, stationed in Yugoslavia since 1943, were part of the column headed for Austria that would take part in the Bleiburg repatriations, and they are estimated to have numbered in the thousands. Nikolai Tolstoy quotes a telegram by General Harold Alexander, sent to the Combined Chiefs of Staff, noting "50,000 Cossacks including 11,000 women, children and old men". At a location near Graz, British forces repatriated around 40,000 Cossacks to SMERSH.

Fort Dix, New Jersey, United States
Although repatriations mainly occurred in Europe, 154 Cossacks were repatriated to the Soviets from Fort Dix, New Jersey, in the United States; three committed suicide in the US and seven were injured. Epstein states that the prisoners put up considerable resistance:

Marseilles, France
Cossacks were included in the hundreds who were repatriated to the Soviet Union from Marseilles in 1946.

Rimini and Bologna, Italy
Several hundred Cossacks were repatriated to the Soviet Union from camps close to Venice in 1947. Some 100 Cossacks perished in resistance to forcible repatriations at Rimini and Bologna.

Liverpool, United Kingdom
Thousands of Russians, many of them Cossacks, were transported at the height of armed hostilities in 1944 to Murmansk in an operation that also led to the sinking of the German battleship Tirpitz.

Aftermath
The Cossack officers, more politically aware than the enlisted men, expected that repatriation to the USSR would be their ultimate fate. They believed that the British would have sympathised with their anti-Communism, but were unaware that their fates had been decided at the Yalta Conference. Upon discovering that they would be repatriated, many escaped, some probably aided by their Allied captors; some passively resisted, and others killed themselves.

Of those Cossacks who escaped repatriation, many hid in forests and mountainsides, some were hidden by the local German populace, but most hid in different identities as Latvians, Poles, Yugoslavians, Turks, Armenians and even Ethiopians. Eventually they were admitted to displaced persons camps under assumed names and nationalities; many emigrated to the US per the Displaced Persons Act. Others went to any country that would admit them (e.g., Germany, Austria, France and Italy). Most Cossacks hid their true national identity until the dissolution of the USSR in late 1991.

Amnesty
After the death of Stalin, a mass partial amnesty  (Amnesty of 1953) was granted for some labor camp inmates on 27 March 1953 with the end of the Gulag system. It was then extended on 17 September 1955. Some specific political crimes were omitted from amnesty: people convicted under Section 58.1(c) of the Criminal Code, stipulating that in the event of a military man escaping Russia, every adult member of his family who abetted the escape or who knew of it would be subject to five to ten years' imprisonment; every dependent who did not know of the escape would be subject to five years' Siberian exile.

Legacy

In literature
The event was documented in publications such as Nicholas Bethell's The Last Secret: The Delivery to Stalin of Over Two Million Russians by Britain and the United States (1974). The first book written about the subject appears to have been Kontra by the Polish writer Józef Mackiewicz, which was published in Polish in London in 1957. Subsequently, in two volumes entitled Velikoe Predatelstvo (The Great Betrayal) published in 1962 and 1970 by a Russian language publisher in New York, Vyacheslav Naumenko, the former ataman of the Kuban Host documented the event. Neither the books of Mackiewicz or Naumenko were translated into English for decades after their publication and hence were almost completely ignored in the English-speaking world. The two volumes of Velikoe Predatelstvo were first translated into English in 2015 and 2018. Kontra has been republished several times in Polish, but has apparently never been translated into English. The first book written in English on the subject was The East Came West (1964) by the British author Peter Huxley-Blythe, but attracted little attention because of Huxley-Blythe's involvement with the European Liberation Front. The cover of The East Came West featured an image taken from a Nazi propaganda poster showing a demonical ape dressed in a Red Army uniform surrounded by fire and brimstone reaching out towards Europe. The first book about the subject published on official documentation was Operation Keelhaul in 1973 by the Austrian-born American author Julius Epstein, which was based on U.S. sources and primarily dealt with the American role in the repatriation.

The subject of the repatriation was largely unknown in the English-speaking world until 1974 when Lord Bethell published his book The Last Secret, which was also turned into a BBC documentary that aired the same year. Bethell was critical of the repatriation, accusing the British government of "intentionally over-fulfilling" the Yalta agreement by handing over people who were not Soviet citizens, but was careful in his treatment of the evidence. The year 1974 also saw the publication in English of Aleksander Solzhenitsyn's book The Gulag Archipelago, where he mentions that many of the prisoners he met in Gulag in the late 1940s were veterans of the Vlasov Army repatriated by the British and Americans in 1945, a policy which he portrayed as craven and self-defeating. Though Solzhenitsyn in The Gulag Archipelago did not deal specifically with the repatriation of the Cossacks, instead dealing with the repatriation of people to the Soviet Union in general, the book increased popular interest in the subject, as did his claim that Anglo-American policy towards the Soviet Union was driven in a fundamentally sinister and conspiratorial way, punishing the alleged friends of the West such as the Vlasov Army and the Cossacks while rewarding its enemies such as the Soviet Union. Solzhenitsyn describes the forced repatriation of the Cossacks by Winston Churchill as follows: "He turned over to the Soviet command the Cossack corps of 90,000 men. Along with them, he also handed over many wagonloads of old people, women and children who did not want to return to their native Cossack rivers. This great hero, monuments to whom will in time cover all England, ordered that they, too, be surrendered to their deaths." The man who led and supervised the entire operation was Major Davies.

Subsequently, Count Nikolai Tolstoy published The Victims of Yalta in 1977, which was described by a critical historian, D.R. Thrope, as "a work of considerable scholarship". Nikolai Tolstoy describes this and other events resulting from the Yalta Conference as the "Secret Betrayal" (cf. Western betrayal), for going unpublished in the West. The 1970s were a period when détente had become fashionable in some quarters and many on the right believed the West was losing the Cold War. The subject of the repatriations in 1945 were used by a variety of right-wing authors in the 1970s-1980s as a symbol of both of the malevolence of the Soviet Union and of a "craven" policy towards the Soviet Union alleged to have been pursued by the successive American and British governments since the Second World War.

Reflecting the increased popular interest in the subject of the repatriations, which had become by the early 1980s to be a symbol of western "pusillanimity" towards the Soviet Union, a monument was unveiled in London on 6 March 1982 to "all the victims of Yalta". John Joliffe, a conservative Catholic British intellectual whose fund-raising help build the monument accused "the British government and their advisors of merciless inhumanity", and ignoring the fact that Churchill was a Conservative went on to blame the repatriations on "the hypocrisy and feebleness of progressive leftists who turned a blind eye to the communist enslavement of Eastern Europe." In May 1983, Tolstoy published an article "The Klagenfurt Conspiracy" in Encounter magazine alleging a conspiracy by Harold Macmillan, the British "resident minister" for the Mediterranean, Field Marshal Harold Alexander and other British officials to hand over the Cossacks. In his article, Tolstoy alleged that on 13 May 1945 in a meeting in the Austrian city of Klagenfurt that Macmillan gave the orders to repatriate all Cossacks regardless if they were Soviet citizens or not. On 11 December 1984, Macmillan was interviewed on the BBC by Ludovic Kennedy and during the course of the interview Kennedy asked several questions about the Cossack repatriation in 1945. Macmillan seems to have been taken by surprise by Kennedy's questions, and the defensive tone of his answers certainly gave public the impression that he had something to hide. Several of Macmillan's statements such as he felt no guilt because the Cossacks were "rebels against Russia", "not friends of ours" and most damaging of all "the Cossacks were practically savages" did not help his reputation. In 1986, Tolstoy followed up his 1983 article with the book The Minister and the Massacres alleging a conspiracy led by Macmillan to deliberately hand over refugees from the Soviet Union and Yugoslavia knowing full well they would be executed. As Macmillan went on to serve as prime minister between 1957 and 1963, Tolstoy's allegations attracted tremendous attention in Britain while also causing immense controversy. The architectural historian and interior designer James Lees-Milne wrote in his diary: "It was wicked to hang Ribbentrop, who was never a criminal. The man who deserved hanging was Harold Macmillan for sentencing all those Poles and Russians who were sent back after the war". The novelist Robert Graves publicly stated: "Harold Macmillan, he's a murderer you know".

There was a political edge to the attacks on Macmillan, who represented the left-wing of the Conservative Party, the so-called "one nation conservatism". The "one nation conservatives" such as Macmillan were often disparaged as the "wets" by the so-called "drys" who represented the right-wing of the Conservative Party. In November 1984, Macmillan gave a much publicised speech in which he called the privatisation plans of the Thatcher government “selling off the family silver”, which made him into a hate figure for the "dry" Conservatives. Additionally, many people on the right-wing of the Conservative Party were passionately opposed to British membership of the European Economic Community (EEC) as the European Union (EU) was then called. Through Britain did not join the EEC until 1973, it was Macmillan who as a prime minister first applied to have Britain join the EEC in July 1961, which was ended in January 1963 when President de Gaulle of France vetoed the British application. For many people on the British right, Macmillan is viewed as something alike to a traitor because of the 1961 application to join the EEC. In 1986, the Federation of Conservative Students in their magazine published a cover story with a photo of Macmillan from 1945 with the question "Guilty of War Crimes?" The question was rhetorical as the article accepted Tolstoy's charges against Macmillan and sought to link his "one nation conservatism" with a policy of weakness towards the Soviet Union.”

In 1985, a British businessman named Nigel Watts became involved in a lengthy and bitter dispute over an insurance claim for the previous ten years with the Sun Alliance insurance company, whose chairman was Lord Aldington. In 1945, Lord Aldington had served as chief of staff of  V Corps that carried out the repatriation. In consultation with Tolstoy, Watts wrote and published a pamphlet accusing Aldington of war crimes for his involvement in repatriating the Cossacks. In 1945, Toby Low (as Aldington then was known) was planning after leaving the Army to enter politics by running  as a Conservative candidate for the House of Commons; Tolstoy has suggested several times that Aldington wanted the patronage of Macmillan, a rising star in the Conservative Party, and would do anything that might please Macmillan such as repatriating the Cossacks in accordance with his wishes. In response, Aldington sued Watts for libel, and Tolstoy insisted on being included as a defendant, seeing a chance to promote his cause.

In response to The Minister and the Massacres, the British historian Robert Knight in his 1986 article "Harold Macmillan and the Cossacks: Was There A Klagenfurt Conspiracy?" accused Tolstoy of scholarly misconduct, writing that in May 1945 British policy in Austria was dictated by Operation Beehive, which entitled preparing for a possible war with Yugoslavia and perhaps the Soviet Union. In May 1945, the Trieste crisis almost caused an Anglo-Yugoslav war as Marshal Josip Broz Tito of Yugoslavia laid claim to the Italian city of Trieste while Britain supported retaining Trieste within Italy. As Yugoslavia was a Soviet ally in 1945, there were very real fears at the time that an Anglo-Yugoslav war could easily escalate into an Anglo-Soviet war. Knight argued that the forced repatriations in Austria undertaken in May 1945 were at least in part an effort to calm down a very tense situation. Knight maintained that the British wanted to clear Austria of all the vast number of prisoners they had taken to free up soldiers now struck guarding the prisoners for a possible war with Yugoslavia and to improve relations by returning peoples who were the enemies of the Yugoslav and Soviet governments. Both the Yugoslav and Soviet governments believed the British were intending to use Axis collaborationist forces such as the Cossack corps against them. To help resolve the raging controversy, Brigadier Anthony Cowgill formed a committee consisting of himself; a former diplomat and "Russia hand" Lord Brimelow, and Christopher Booker, a journalist well known for his conservative views. Cowgill believed that the honour of the British Army had been smeared, but Booker was a supporter of Tolstoy when he joined the committee in 1986.

Between 2 October-30 November 1989, the much publicised libel trial of Tolstoy vs. Aldington took place and ended with the jury ruling in the favour of the latter and awarding him £1.5 million. The judgement, which forced Tolstoy into bankruptcy, was widely criticized as excessive and unfair. The way in which the Ministry of Defence supplied Aldington with certain documents that were denied to Tolstoy has been an especially controversial aspect of the trial, and Tolstoy continues to maintain that he was a victim of "the Establishment". Tolstoy retained a loyal set of defenders consisting of the Conservative MP Bernard Braine, the philosopher Roger Scruton, the journalist Chapman Pincher, the writer Nigel Nicolson, Lord Cranborne and from farther afield Solzhenitsyn, who was living in exile in the United States at the time. The Tolstoy vs. Aldington case attracted much publicity as the British journalist Hugo de Burgh wrote: "From 1989 to 1993 a historical investigation became news in tabloid and broadsheet media alike as argument raged over the merits of combatants in a struggle over who might have done what over a few days in 1945. The case of "the Cossacks" has been perhaps the single most prominent example of historical investigation to be turned into journalism, not only in acres of newsprint devoted to the story and based upon several books on the subject, but also in a programme in the BBC historical series, Timewatch".

After four years of investigation, in October 1990 the Cowgill committee published its report, The Repatriations from Austria in 1945 whose conclusions largely echoed those reached by Knight in 1986 that British policy in Austria was largely governed by preparations for a possible war with Yugoslavia and perhaps the Soviet Union as well. About Tolstoy's allegations that Macmillan was a major war criminal, the Cowgill committee concluded that Macmillan's role in the repatriations was very small and largely dictated by military considerations. During its investigation, the Cowgill committee found copies of British documents that were not available in the Public Record Office among the personal papers of Alexander Comstock Kirk, a gay American diplomat who donated all of his personal papers from his death to the National Archives in Washington. In a column published in the Sunday Times on 21 October 1990, Robert Harris accused the Cowgill committee of a "whitewash", and maintained that Tolstoy's claims that Britain had willfully sent thousands of people to their deaths in the Soviet Union and Yugoslavia was still correct. Cowgill sued Harris and the Times for libel and the case was settled out of court with the Times agreeing to donate to a charity of Cowgill's choice, in this case the Army Benevolent Fund. By contrast, the journalist Daniel Johnson wrote on 19 October 1990: "As Cowgill shows, Macmillan was telling the truth; that he had merely advised officers on the ground that Allied policy under the Yalta agreement was to hand back the Cossacks and he had, like everybody else, had been unaware that a large number of them were Russian emigres."

In 1992, Sir Carol Mather, a veteran turned Conservative MP wrote in his memoirs Aftermath of War: Everyone Must Go Home that the overwhelming feeling shared by himself and other British Army officers in Austria in 1945 was that the Cossacks had willingly fought for Nazi Germany and had committed terrible atrocities against Italian civilians while fighting against Italian partisans in 1944–1945, meaning no-one had any sympathy for them. By contrast, Major Harold Lunghi who served as part of the British Military Mission in Moscow during World War Two and was closely involved in the talks to repatriate British POWs taken prisoner by the Germans who had been liberated by the Red Army, remained highly critical of the decision to repatriate the Cossacks. Lunghi who worked closely with the "very ruthless" General Filipp Golikov recalled in an interview on 19 March 2009: "In Moscow, as among most people who had knowledge and experience of Russia, we were appalled to learn rather late in the day that we were forcibly returning White Russians and others who did not hold Soviet citizenship to the Soviet Union. It was all the more misguided because the Soviet side at first did not lay any claim to them. As far as I recall, Golikov did not initially refer to them at all. On the contrary, the Soviet side at first said and wrote that their concern was Soviet citizens. We knew very well what his, that is, Stalin's priority and why. The Cossacks and the others were a late icing on the cake for Stalin"."

In 1997, Booker published his book A Looking Glass Tragedy, in which he wrote: "there was almost no part of the story which we found to be free from serious error, even to the point where atrocities and massacres described at length were found not to have taken place at all. Even the general belief that most of the Cossacks had died after their return to the Soviet Union turned out to be a wild exaggeration". In a review of A Looking Glass Tragedy, the British historian Alistair Horne alleged that four of the six massacres of Cossacks by the NKVD described by Tolstoy never took place and: "Of the Cossacks repatriated to Russia, few were actually killed; horrendous as their privations were, the vast majority survived the Gulag." Horne argued that the "absurd" sum awarded to Aldington had made Tolstoy into a "national martyr", and felt that the case showed a need for reforming English libel law.  Booker described the British media as suffering from a "Cleverdick Culture", accusing most journalists of being overtly motivated by the need to increase sales in a very competitive business via sensationalistic stories intended to promote public outrage and of being excessively credulous, especially about topics in which the journalists knew little, thus leading journalists to accept the Tolstoy thesis uncritically. Booker noted that the BBC produced nine television or radio documentaries that largely accepted Tolstoy's allegations at face value, which he saw as an example of the "Cleverdick Culture". By contrast, Ian Mitchell in his 1997 book The Cost of a Reputation: Aldington versus Tolstoy : the Causes, Course and Consequences of the Notorious Libel Case argued that there had been an "Establishment" conspiracy against Tolstoy, claiming that the Foreign Office and the Defence ministry had deprived Tolstoy of documents that had been helpful to him at this trial. The Cost of a Reputation was a book privately printed and paid for by Lord Portsmouth, an admirer of Tolstoy.

The British historian Edwyn Morris in his 2008 essay "The Repatriation of the Cossacks from Austria in 1945" argued that for Churchill a major concern in 1945 was securing the return of all the British POWs in German POW camps who had fallen into Soviet hands as the Red Army advanced into Germany in 1944-45 and British policies on repatriation on people to the Soviet Union was dictated by the fear that Stalin might hold the British POWs as hostages. Morris argued that Churchill had a well founded belief that if the British granted asylum to the Cossacks, then the Soviets would not return the British POWs. Under the Yalta agreement, the Soviets were to repatriate American and British POWs that came into Red Army hands in exchange for the American and British governments were to repatriate people from the Soviet Union who fell into their hands. Morris argued that if Britain broke the terms of the Yalta Agreement by granting asylum to the Cossacks, then the Soviet Union might likewise break the terms of the Yalta agreement and refuse to repatriate the hundreds of thousands of British POWs whom the Germans had concentrated in POW camps in eastern Germany (it was German policy to build POW camps in eastern Germany as it made it more difficult for POWs who escaped to reach western Europe). Morris also maintained that since the Cossacks had fought for Germany, it was unreasonable to expect Churchill to sacrifice thousands of British POWs just to save them. As it was, the British POWs in Soviet hands were returned to the United Kingdom "humanely and expeditiously".

The British historian D.R. Thorpe in his 2010 biography Supermac came close to accusing Tolstoy of scholarly misconduct, stating that the "White Russians" that Macmillan mentioned in his diary in 1945 were not the Cossacks as Tolstoy claimed, but rather the Russian Protective Corps, a collaborationist unit that fought for Nazi Germany whose men were either Russian emigres living in Yugoslavia or the sons of these emigres. Thorpe wrote that strictly speaking the term "White Russian" described any Russian who fought on the White side in the Russian Civil War or those anti-Communist Russians who went into exile, but in British official circles in World War Two and in the British Army the term "White Russian" was used indiscriminately to describe any anti-Communist person from the territory of the modern Soviet Union, regardless if they were Russian or not. Thus, the British called the Vlasov Army "White Russians" even through General Andrei Vlasov and his men were all former Red Army POWs who had decided to fight for Germany. Thorpe argued that this blanket use of the term "White Russian" together with a lack of qualified officers who could speak Russian ensured that the British in 1945 did not make much effort to distinguish between those Cossacks living in the Soviet Union who had volunteered to fight for Germany vs. those Cossacks living in exile who had volunteered to fight for Germany. Thorpe further argued that Tolstoy seemed unaware of the way the British used the term "White Russian" in World War Two and as he uses the term "White Russian" in the more limited sense, he assumes that the British were consciously repatriating people whom they knew were not Soviet citizens.

William Dritschilo described the events at Lienz in Lienz Cossacks, his novelization of  the Cossack experience of the 20th century.

Memorials

In Lienz, Austria, there is an 18-gravestone cemetery commemorating the "Tragedy of the Drau". Many of the gravestones mark mass graves holding unknown numbers.

In popular culture
The plot of the James Bond film GoldenEye (1995) involves the resentment of villain Alec Trevelyan (played by Sean Bean), known as "Janus", the son of "Lienz Cossacks". Janus plots the destruction of the British economy because of "the British betrayal and Stalin's execution squads", the latter of which he and his family had survived, but, tormented by survivor's guilt, his father ultimately killed his wife, then himself, leaving Alec orphaned. Bond (played by Pierce Brosnan) says of the repatriation, "Not exactly our finest hour", though the Russian Mafia boss Valentin Zukovsky (played by Robbie Coltrane) replies "Still, ruthless people, Cossacks – they got what they deserved".
These events provide the historical context for the Foyle's War episode "The Russian House".

See also
 Andrey Vlasov
 Collaboration with the Axis Powers during World War II
 Cossackia
German prisoners of war in the Soviet Union
 Operation Keelhaul
 Russian Liberation Army
 Russian Monument (Liechtenstein)
 The Red Danube
Western betrayal
Forest brothers
Aftermath of World War II
Swedish extradition of Baltic soldiers

References

Sources
 
 
 
 Naumenko, Gen. V. G. (2011). Great Betrayal. (Translation by William Dritschilo of (1962) Великое Предательство, All Slavic Publishing House, New York) .
 Naumenko, Gen. V. G. (2018). Great Betrayal. Volume 2. (Translation by William Dritschilo of (1970) Великое Предательство, Том ІІ, All Slavic Publishing House, New York) .

Further reading
 Catherine Andreyev (1987). Vlasov and the Russian Liberation Movement: Soviet Reality and Émigré Theories. Cambridge: Cambridge University Press; .
 Brent Mueggenberg (2019). The Cossack Struggle Against Communism, 1917 - 1945 Jefferson: McFarland & Company; 
 Nikolai Tolstoy (1978). The Secret Betrayal. New York: Charles Scribner's Sons; .
 Nikolai Tolstoy (1981). Stalin's Secret War. London: Jonathan Cape; .
 John Ure (2002). The Cossacks: An Illustrated History. London: Gerald Duckworth; .
 Samuel J. Newland (1991). Cossacks in the German Army 1941–1945, London: Franc Cass; .
 Ian Mitchell (1997). The cost of a reputation. Lagavulin: Topical Books; .
 Józef Mackiewicz (1993). Kontra. London: Kontra; .
 Harald Stadler/Martin Kofler/Karl C.Berger (2005). Flucht in die Hoffnungslosigkeit-Die Kosaken in Osttirol. Innsbruck;  (in German)

External links
Return to the scene of the crime Gordon Dritschilo, rutlandherald.com, 30 June 2005
A footnote to Yalta Jeremy Murray-Brown, Documentary at Boston University (Describes the extradition event in great detail, focusing on a 7-minute film-clip of the event.)

Aftermath of World War II in the Soviet Union
British collusion with Soviet World War II crimes
History of the Cossacks in Russia
Post–World War II forced migrations
Soviet Union–United Kingdom relations
People extradited to the Soviet Union
American collusion with Soviet World War II crimes